Nkenglikok is a town in southern Cameroon, in the department of Nyong-et-Kéllé. Cameroonian footballer Rigobert Song was born there. Song holds the record for the most caps for the Cameroon national team with 137.

Populated places in Centre Region (Cameroon)